Vincenzo Cantiello (born 25 August 2000) is an Italian singer who   at the 12th annual Junior Eurovision Song Contest in Malta with his song "Tu primo grande amore" and won.

Early years
Cantiello was born on 25 August 2000 in Sant'Arpino, Campania.  He has been interested in music since early childhood initially singing in the choir of his church, but had started singing on his own when he was 9.

Music career
He gained national attention after taking part in Ti lascio una canzone in 2014. On the following 15 November, he represented Italy at the Junior Eurovision Song Contest 2014 with his song "Tu primo grande amore", fishing first with a total of 159 points, just twelve points ahead from 's Planet of the Children who placed second. He was Italy's first ever entrant at the competition and also the only male solo singer in the entire competition. He read out the Italian votes and handed the trophy to the winner. In , for the occasion of the 20th edition of the event, Cantiello performed as part of the winners interval act in Yerevan.

Discography

Singles

Albums

References

External links

 Vincenzo Cantiello profile at the Junior Eurovision official website
 Videos on the Junior Eurovision official channel on YouTube
 Vincenzo Cantiello - Tu primo grande amore (Italy) 2014 Junior Eurovision Song Contest (studio version)
 Vincenzo Cantiello - Tu primo grande amore (Italy) 2014 LIVE JESC 2014 (live in the final)
 Vincenzo Cantiello - All of me

2000 births
Living people
Italian child singers
Italian pop singers
Junior Eurovision Song Contest winners
People from the Province of Caserta
21st-century Italian  male singers